Svinhufvud (literally translated as "Swine head") is a family of ancient Swedish nobility originating from Dalarna. The family is incorporated both at the Swedish House of Nobility and the Finnish House of Nobility.

A prominent member is P. E. Svinhufvud, President of Finland from 1931 to 1937. Prince Daniel, Duke of Västergötland (né Daniel Westling), the husband of Victoria, Crown Princess of Sweden, shares ancestors very far back in time with this family.

See also
 Per Gustaf Svinhufvud af Qvalstad

References 

Swedish noble families
Finnish noble families
Finnish families of Swedish ancestry